Boldino is a rural locality (a settlement) in Pekshinskoye Rural Settlement, Petushinsky District, Vladimir Oblast, Russia. The population was 417 as of 2010. There are 17 streets.

Geography 
Boldino is located 23 km east of Petushki (the district's administrative centre) by road. Peksha is the nearest rural locality.

References 

Rural localities in Petushinsky District